This is a list of American television-related events in 1960.

Events

Also occurring in 1960
Frank and Doris Hursley start their soap opera writing career, taking the jobs of joint head writers for the series Search for Tomorrow.
Nearly 90% of homes in the United States now have at least one television set.

Television programs

Debuts

Ending this year

Television stations

Station launches

Network affiliation changes

Station closures

Births

Deaths

See also
1960 in television 
1960 in film 
1960 in the United States
List of American films of 1960

References

External links
List of 1960 American television series at IMDb